Juarez Moreira (born 1954 in Guanhães, Brazil) is a Brazilian guitarist and composer.

Music career
A native of Guanhães, Brazil, Moreira went to school in Belo Horizonte. In 1978 his music career began with Wagner Tiso. He released several albums in Brazil. His first album to be released in America was Bom Dia with vocalist Ithamara Koorax in 1998. Moreira has also worked with Brazilian musicians Toninho Horta and Milton Nascimento.

Discography
 Bom Dia (1989)
 Nuvens Douradas (1995), (music by Tom Jobim)
 Aquarelas (1996) with saxophonist Nivaldo Ornelas (music by Ary Barroso) 
 Instrumental no CCBB (1997) with guitarist Badi Assad
 Samblues (1997)
 Good Morning (Malandro Records, 1998)
 Quadros Modernos (2000) with guitarists Toninho Horta and Chiquito Braga
 Solo (2003), (Juarez Moreira solo guitar)
 Juá (2007)
 Bim Bom (Motéma Music, 2009) with vocalist Ithamara Koorax (music by João Gilberto)
 Riva (2010), (Juarez Moreira solo guitar)
 Juarez Moreira: Ao Vivo no Palácio das Artes (2011)
 Castelo (TBC Records, 2013) with trompeter Peter Scharli and pianist Hans Feigenwinter
 Cuerdas Del Sur (2018) with guitarists Toninho Horta, Chiquito Braga, Luiz Salinas and Bassist Cristian Gálvez
 Cine Pathé (2018), (songs by Juarez Moreira with lyrics and vocals)

References

External links
 Official site in Portuguese

1954 births
Living people
Brazilian guitarists
Brazilian male guitarists
Malandro Records artists